Jacopino da Tradate (c. 1371 – 1445) Tradate, was an Italian Gothic sculptor active in Lombardy and the County of Savoy.

Jacopino created the statue of Pope Martin V for the Duomo of Milan

External links
 Pope Martin V Statue by Jacopino

1371 births
1445 deaths
Italian sculptors
Italian male sculptors